Seoul Metropolitan City Route 21 is an urban road located in Seoul, South Korea. This route is a part of Asian Highway 1.

Stopovers

 Seoul
 Geumcheon District - Gwanak District / Guro District - Dongjak District / Yeongdeungpo District - Dongjak District - Yongsan District - Jung District - Jongno District - Seodaemun District - Eunpyeong District

List of Facilities 
IS: Intersection, IC: Interchange

References

Roads in Seoul
AH1